Bugg is an unincorporated community located in Hickman County, Kentucky, United States.

References

Unincorporated communities in Hickman County, Kentucky
Unincorporated communities in Kentucky